Berlinda Addardey, popularly known as Berla Mundi, (born 1 April 1988) is a Ghanaian media personality, women's advocate and voice artist. She co-hosted the 20th VGMA with Kwami Sefa Kayi.

Education 
Berla is an alumna of St. Theresa's School, Achimota School and the University of Ghana where she studied linguistics and psychology for her first degree.

She studied French at Alliance Francais. She also studied at the Ghana Institute of Journalism.

Career 
She began her media career after becoming the second runner-up at the 2010 Miss Maliaka beauty pageant. She worked with GHOne TV a subsidiary of the EIB Network for five years. She is currently with TV3 Ghana a subsidiary of Media General Ghana Limited. Berla hosted reality shows and corporate events. She hosted Africa's first syndicated show on DSTV, Moment with MO. She was recognized as the most influential Ghanaian in 2017 by Avance Media. In 2017 She won The Most Stylish Media Personality at the Glitz Style Awards Founded by Claudia Lumor.

Mundi is known for her advocacy for girls and women's rights. She launched a mentoring and career guidance project in 2018. It aims to offer skills training to young women.

She established the Berla Mundi foundation in 2015. In June 2019, Mundi was featured in the Visual Collaborative electronic catalog, under the Polaris series. She is also the founder of the B.You project

Shows hosted

Awards and recognition 

 Best female events MC – Ghana Events Awards (2017).
 TV female entertainment show host of the year. – RTP Awards (2018)
 Favorite TV presenter – Peoples choice celebrity awards (2017).
 Media Personality of the year – Glitz Style Awards (2018).
Most Influential Media Personality- Avance Media (2020).
Ghana Woman of the Year, Young Star Award(2020).
TVET Ambassador.

See also 

 The Giovani's prank game
Berla helps young Susan get scholarship and support

References 

1988 births
Living people
Ghanaian television presenters
Ghanaian women television presenters
University of Ghana alumni
Alumni of Achimota School